Chung Nam-sik (Hangul: 정남식, Hanja: 鄭南湜, 16 February 1917 – 5 April 2005) was a Korean football player and manager. He played as a striker for the South Korea national team during the 1940s and 1950s, including at the 1948 Summer Olympics.

Honors

Manager
South Korea
 Merdeka Tournament: 1965

References

External links
 

1917 births
2005 deaths
South Korean footballers
Association football forwards
South Korea international footballers
Olympic footballers of South Korea
Footballers at the 1948 Summer Olympics
1954 FIFA World Cup players
Asian Games medalists in football
Footballers at the 1954 Asian Games
Asian Games silver medalists for South Korea
Medalists at the 1954 Asian Games
South Korean football managers
South Korea national football team managers
People from Gimje
Sportspeople from North Jeolla Province